Noon is an extended play by New Zealand band Drax Project, released in June 2018. The EP was released after their single "Woke Up Late" (2017) became a hit in New Zealand, and during the band's tour of Europe with Camila Cabello, on her Never Be the Same Tour.

Production

Noon is a collection of songs from the band's back-catalogue. Originally the band planned to release a studio album, but due to the success of the song "Woke Up Late", Drax Project quickly recorded and compiled Noon. The band decided to release Noon only a few weeks before leaving for Europe, to perform as an opening act on Camila Cabello's Never Be the Same Tour.

The songs on the extended play were written around a common theme of new beginnings. The EP's title came from a lyric in the lead single "Woke Up Late" ("awake 'til dawn, slept 'til noon").

Release and promotion

"Woke Up Late" was the first song released from the EP, in November 2017, which became a hit in New Zealand in March 2018. "Toto" was released as the EP's second single in August 2018.

The band released Noon while touring Europe with Camila Cabello, on her Never Be the Same Tour.

Critical reception

At the 2018 New Zealand Music Awards, Drax Project were nominated for the Aotearoa Music Award for Best Group due to the release of Noon.

Track listing

Credits and personnel

Credits adapted from Tidal.

Devin Abrams – producer (1–2, 4–5), songwriter (1–5)
Matt Beachen – drums, songwriter
Marlon Gerbes – songwriter (5)
Simon Gooding – engineer
Stuart Hawkes – mastering engineer
Kyle Kelso – producer (3)
Ben O'Leary – bass guitar, songwriter
Sam Thomson – bass (vocal), songwriter
Shaan Singh – vocals, songwriting
Matiu Walters – songwriting (5)

Charts

Weekly charts

Year-end charts

Certifications

Release history

References

2018 EPs
Pop albums by New Zealand artists